The 2020–21 New Jersey Devils season was the 47th season for the National Hockey League franchise that was established on June 11, 1974, and 39th season since the franchise relocated from Colorado prior to the 1982–83 NHL season. Due to the COVID-19 pandemic and COVID-19 cross-border travel restrictions imposed by the Government of Canada, the Devils played a shortened 56-game regular season, which consisted of divisional play only, with the Devils being temporarily realigned from the Metropolitan Division to the East Division.

Fan attendance in home games was prohibited until March 1, 2021, per an executive order from Governor of New Jersey Phil Murphy. The Devils reopened Prudential Center to spectators on March 2.

On April 20, following a 7–6 loss to the Pittsburgh Penguins, the Devils were eliminated from playoff contention for the third consecutive season.

Standings

Divisional standings

Schedule and results

Regular season
The regular season schedule was published on December 23, 2020.

Player statistics
As of May 11, 2021

Skaters

Goaltenders

Transactions
The Devils have been involved in the following transactions during the 2020–21 season.

Trades

Free agents

Waivers

Contract terminations

Retirement

Signings

Draft picks

Below are the New Jersey Devils' selections at the 2020 NHL Entry Draft, which was held on October 6 and 7, 2020, in a remote format, with teams convening via videoconferencing, and Commissioner Gary Bettman announcing selections from the NHL Network studios in Secaucus, New Jersey. It was originally scheduled to be held on June 26–27, 2020, at the Bell Centre in Montreal, Quebec, but was postponed on March 25, 2020 due to the COVID-19 pandemic and the conclusion of the 2020 Stanley Cup playoffs.

Notes:
 The Arizona Coyotes' first-round pick went to the New Jersey Devils as the result of a trade on December 16, 2019, that sent Taylor Hall and Blake Speers to Arizona in exchange for Nick Merkley, Kevin Bahl, Nate Schnarr, a conditional third-round pick in 2021 and this pick (being conditional at the time of the trade).
 The Vancouver Canucks' first-round pick went to the New Jersey Devils as the result of a trade on February 16, 2020, that sent Blake Coleman to Tampa Bay in exchange for Nolan Foote and this pick (being conditional at the time of the trade).
 The Carolina Hurricanes' third-round pick went to the New Jersey Devils as the result of a trade on February 24, 2020, that sent Sami Vatanen to Carolina in exchange for Fredrik Claesson, Janne Kuokkanen and this pick (being conditional at the time of the trade).
 The Boston Bruins' fourth-round pick went to the New Jersey Devils as the result of a trade on February 25, 2019, that sent Marcus Johansson to Boston in exchange for a second-round pick in 2019 and this pick.

Notes

References

New Jersey Devils seasons
New Jersey Devils
New Jersey Devils
New Jersey Devils
New Jersey Devils
21st century in Newark, New Jersey